The Fourteenth Oklahoma Legislature was a meeting of the legislative branch of the government of Oklahoma, composed of the Oklahoma Senate and the Oklahoma House of Representatives. The state legislature met from January 3 to April 22, 1933, and from May 24 to July 15, 1933, during the term of Governor William H. Murray. the governor had convinced state senator Tom Anglin to run for the Oklahoma House of Representatives, assuring him that he would be elected as Speaker. Under Anglin's leadership, the House approved the governor's proposed budget cuts.

Dates of sessions
Regular session: January 3-April 22, 1933
Special session: May 24-July 15, 1933
Previous: 13th Legislature • Next: 15th Legislature

Party composition

Senate

House of Representatives

Leadership
Paul Stewart served as President Pro Tem of the Senate and Tom Anglin of Holdenville, Oklahoma, served as Speaker of the Oklahoma House of Representatives. Bob Fitzgerald of Hobart, Oklahoma, served as Speaker Pro Tempore. John Steele Batson of Marietta served as House Majority Floor Leader.

Members

Senate

Table based on state almanac and list of all senators.

House of Representatives

Table based on government database.

References

External links
Oklahoma Legislature
Oklahoma House of Representatives
Oklahoma Senate

Oklahoma legislative sessions
1933 in Oklahoma
1934 in Oklahoma
1933 U.S. legislative sessions
1934 U.S. legislative sessions